A Favorita (English: The Favorite) is a Brazilian telenovela produced and broadcast TV Globo. It premiered 2 June 2008 to 17 January 2009 with a total number of episodes of 197. It is created by João Emanuel Carneiro and directed by Ricardo Waddington. It is also the first telenovela by the writer to air in the 9 pm timeslot.

A Favorita storylines examine two friends, Donatela and Flora, who became rivals. One of them committed a crime and is lying, so there are two versions of the same story.

The telenovela was originally screened as six episodes per week, from Monday to Saturday, with an average running time of one hour. A Favorita has remained significant in terms of Rede Globo's success and audience share, and also in Brazilian television drama history, tackling many controversial and taboo issues previously unseen on mainstream television in Brazil.

It made history for being the first telenovela where the public did not know who was the villain and who was telling the truth.

Cláudia Raia, Patrícia Pillar, Murilo Benício, Mariana Ximenes, Lília Cabral, Taís Araújo, Deborah Secco, Carmo Dalla Vecchia, Glória Menezes, Mauro Mendonça and Tarcísio Meira in the leading roles.

In August 2014, Globo Marcas released an edited version of the telenovela in DVD format.

Plot
Donatela and Flora, two friends who became rivals. One of them committed a homicide and pretends to be innocent. There are two versions for the same story. Who, after all, is telling the truth? Donatela or Flora?

Donatela and Flora grew up together. Donatela lost her parents in an accident and ended up being adopted by Flora's family. By the time they were children, the two girls were best friends to the point of starting a country band, “Faísca e Espoleta” (Flash and Fusee). The partnership made a reasonable success at the time, but the career was interrupted after they met friends Marcelo and Dodi, to whom they became engaged. Donatela married Marcelo, Gonçalo Fontini's son, heir of a paper and cellulose corporation, while Flora married Dodi, an unscrupulous man who worked for his friend's father.

However, Donatela and Marcelo's happiness didn't last too long. The couple's first son, Matheus, was kidnapped when he was six months old, never to appear again. Since then the couple started to argue very often. In the meantime, Flora and Dodi split up and she had an affair with Marcelo. She gave birth to Lara, daughter to Marcelo, harming even more his relationship with Donatela and mostly the relationship between the two friends.

In the worst period of the crisis between Donatela and Flora, Marcelo was murdered. He was shot three times with a gun that, according to witnesses, was in Flora's possession. She was arrested and sent to jail for eighteen years. Donatela, despite not forgiving Flora for the treason and for killing the love of her life, raised Lara with the love of a true mother.

Eighteen years later, after being released from prison, Flora starts trying to prove her innocence, blaming Donatela for the crime she has already paid for. Donatela fears that Flora may want to take her beloved daughter Lara away. Lara becomes the target of the dispute between the two women, who were once friends. While Flora tries to get her daughter back, Donatela will do everything she can to stop her.

Cast

Guest stars

Soundtracks

A Favorita has released three official soundtrack albums: one composed mostly of Brazilian songs (Nacional - "national" soundtrack), one mostly of international songs (Internacional), and a third one, with sertanejo music (a kind of Brazilian country music).

Nacional soundtrack

 "É o Que Me Interessa" - Lenine (Flora's theme)
 "Amado" - Vanessa da Mata (Lara and Cassiano's / Lara and Halley's theme)
 "Sou Dela" - Nando Reis (Lara's theme)
 "Não Vou Me Adaptar" - - Arnaldo Antunes and Nando Reis (Didu's theme)
 "Quantas Vidas Você Tem?" - Paulinho Moska (Rita and Didu's theme)
 "Fala" - Ritchie (Augusto César's theme)
 "Tudo Passa" - Túlio Dek (Halley's theme)
 "Pa' Bailar" - Bajofondo (opening theme)
 "Mulher Sem Razão" - Adriana Calcanhotto (Donatela and Zé Bob's theme)
 "Morena dos Olhos d'água" - Chico Buarque
 "O Tempo Vai Apagar" - Zé Renato (Rita's theme)
 "Me Abrace (Abrázame)" - Camila & Wanessa Camargo (Stela's theme)

Internacional soundtrack

 "Viva La Vida" - Coldplay (general theme)
 "Bottle It Up" - Sara Bareilles (Dedina and Damião's theme)
 "I'm Yours" - Jason Mraz (Cassiano's theme)
 "Carry You Home" - James Blunt (Augusto César's theme)
 "Love is Noise" - The Verve
 "That's Not My Name" - The Ting Tings (Alícia's theme)
 "Blame" - Tiago Iorc (Halley's theme)
 "Fidelity" - Regina Spektor (Lara's theme)
 "Sweet About Me" - Gabriella Cilmi
 "No Substitute Love" - Estelle (location theme)
 "Baby When the Light" - David Guetta (Orlandinho's theme / nightclub theme)
 "Pumpkin Soup" - Kate Nash (location theme)
 "Young Folks" - Peter Bjorn and John

Impact

Ratings

In his first chapter, A Favorita recorded 35 points and 49% share, with the worst debut of a 8PM telenovela to date. These ratings are low due to the good performance of the final chapter of Caminhos do Coração, displayed simultaneously.

The ratings varied greatly over the weeks, until in Chapter 56, the telenovela recorded his record: 46 points and 65% share. Lowest audience was recorded on New Year's Eve: 25 points with a peak of 32.

In the final chapters, showed better performance: 52 points/76% share in the penultimate chapter; and 52 points/69.4% share in the last chapter, being the most watched broadcasts of recent years in Brazilian television.

Awards

References

External links
Subtitled episodes

A Favorita (Brazilian Website) (in Portuguese)

2008 telenovelas
2008 Brazilian television series debuts
2009 Brazilian television series endings
Brazilian telenovelas
Brazilian LGBT-related television shows
TV Globo telenovelas
Telenovelas by João Emanuel Carneiro
Portuguese-language telenovelas
Child abduction in television